Douglass may refer to:

Surname 
 Douglass (surname)
 Douglass family, family of Frederick Douglass
 Frederick Douglass (1818–1895), noted abolitionist

Given name
Douglass Dumbrille (1889–1974), Canadian actor in early Hollywood
Douglass Houghton (1809–1845), American geologist and physician
Douglass Morse Howell (1906 – 1994), American papermaker and artist
Douglass Lubahn (1947–2019), rock bassist
Douglass Montgomery (1907–1966), American actor
Douglass North (1920–2015), American economist and Nobel Prize laureate
Douglass Wallop (1920–1985), American novelist and playwright
Douglass Watson (1921–1989), American actor

Places
In the United States:
 Douglass, Kansas
 Douglass (Memphis), a neighborhood in Memphis, Tennessee
 Douglass, Texas
 Douglass (Washington, D.C.), a neighborhood of Washington, D.C.
 Douglass Township (disambiguation)

Elsewhere:
 Mount Douglass, Antarctica
 Douglass (lunar crater), named after A. E. Douglass
 Douglass (Martian crater)

Other uses
 Douglass Residential College (Rutgers University)
 Douglass House (disambiguation)
 Douglass School (disambiguation)
 Douglass Theatre, Macon, Georgia

See also
 Douglas (disambiguation)
 Douglassville, Pennsylvania